Sir Christopher Hatton KB (5 March 1581 – 10 September 1619) was an English politician who sat in the House of Commons between 1601 and 1614. He was also an active patron of the arts.

Early life
Hatton was the eldest son of John Hatton of Longstanton, Cambridgeshire and his wife, Jane Shute, daughter of Robert Shute. He was related to Sir Christopher Hatton (1540-1591), Queen Elizabeth I's favourite, and following the death of the elder Christopher's heir, he succeeded to the estates in 1597. He was made a royal ward in 1599.  He was educated at Cambridge by 1599.

Career
In 1601, Hatton was elected Member of Parliament for Buckingham.
Hatton married Alice Fanshawe, daughter of Thomas Fanshawe of Ware Park, Hertfordshire on 13 March 1602.

Hatton received the favour of James I. He was knighted with the Order of the Bath in 1603. In 1606 he was elected MP for Bedford replacing Humphrey Winch who became a judge. In 1614 Hatton was elected MP for Huntingdon.

In 1616 Hatton's brother-in-law Henry Fanshawe died. The post of remembrancer of the exchequer, which effectively belonged to the Fanshawe family, became vacant. Hatton succeeded his brother-in-law on a temporary basis (the remembrancership was held in trust for Fanshawe's son Thomas), which lasted for the rest of his life. Hatton also became joint steward  of the manor of Barking in 1616.

Hatton died intestate aged 38 in 1619 and was buried in Westminster Abbey.
He had at least one son and daughter and was succeeded by his son Christopher Hatton, 1st Baron Hatton who became Baron Hatton of Kirby.

Patronage of the arts
Hatton was a patron of the composer Tobias Hume, who dedicated his Poeticall Musicke to him. He was also a patron and friend of Orlando Gibbons who dedicated his First Set of Madrigals and Motets, which in included one of the most famous English madrigals: The Silver Swan. Gibbons stated in his dedication that:

This quote has been interpreted in suggesting that Hatton was responsible for some of the texts in the set, but there is no decisive evidence to support this. It is also unlikely that Gibbons was a resident of Hatton's household, though it is possible that their friendship led to Hatton setting a room aside for him to compose. Gibbons' children, Christopher and Alice were likely the namesakes of Hatton and his wife respectively.

References

Sources
Books

 

 

 

Articles

 

Online

 

 

1581 births
1619 deaths
English MPs 1601
English MPs 1604–1611
English MPs 1614
Alumni of the University of Cambridge
People from Buckingham
16th-century English people